The Chartered Institute of Payroll Professionals (CIPP) is a chartered professional association in the United Kingdom, representing payroll, pensions and reward professionals. It has 9,500 members and is registered with the UK government for providing training, higher education and qualifications. It is a member of the government Employment and Payroll Group, HMRC's principal consultation forum for employers and their intermediaries  and the Compliance Reform Forum in which HMRC consults about changes to HMRC compliance checking activities.

References 

Professional associations based in the United Kingdom
Government of the United Kingdom
Organisations based in the West Midlands (county)
Industry in Europe